USS Biddle (DD–151) was a  in the United States Navy during World War II, later reclassified AG-114. She was the second ship named for Captain Nicholas Biddle.

Construction and commissioning
Biddle was launched on 3 October 1918 by William Cramp & Sons Ship and Engine Building Company, Philadelphia, sponsored by Miss Elise B. Robinson, a great-great-grandniece of Captain Biddle. The ship was commissioned on 22 April 1919.

Service history
Following her commissioning, Biddle made a cruise to the Mediterranean Sea and returned to New York on 1 July 1920. After assignment to Division 48, Atlantic Fleet, she cruised along the east coast until decommissioned at Philadelphia Navy Yard on 20 June 1922. She remained laid up until recommissioned on 16 October 1939. Until November 1940 she served on patrol duty with Destroyer Division 66, Atlantic Squadron, and on training duty with Naval Reserve Officers Training Corps. She patrolled in the Caribbean Sea under orders of the Commandant, 15th Naval District (November 1940-May 1941) and then rejoined Destroyer Division 66 patrolling out of Key West, Florida.

Biddle spent March 1942-February 1945 on convoy duty in the Caribbean except for two short periods. She formed part of anti-submarine TG 2. (18 January 1944 – 27 February 1944) and escorted a convoy to North Africa (24 March 1944 – 11 May 1944). During the latter mission, 11–12 April, while fighting off an air attack, she had seven men wounded by a strafing attack by a German plane. Biddle operated off the east coast, March–July 1945, on training exercises with motor torpedo boats. She was reclassified a miscellaneous auxiliary (AG-114) on 30 June 1945, and arrived at Boston Navy Yard on 15 July for conversion. Her conversion was completed just as the war with Japan ended and she remained at Boston until decommissioned on 5 October 1945. She was sold for scrap on 3 December 1946.

Awards
Biddle received one battle star for her service with Convoy UGS-37.

References

External links
 NavSource Photos

 

Wickes-class destroyers
World War II destroyers of the United States
World War II auxiliary ships of the United States
Ships built by William Cramp & Sons
1918 ships